The Nokia 8600 Luna is a mobile phone produced by Nokia.  It has a stainless steel body, and weighs 140 grams.

Features include: TFT display (240 x 320 pixels), 2 megapixel camera,
video recording and streaming, digital music player, and FM radio.

References

External links 
 Nokia 8600, review, Ellis Benton, cnet.co.uk, July 6, 2007.

8600 Luna
Mobile phones introduced in 2007
Slider phones